San Ginés can refer to:

San Ginés, Madrid, church in Madrid
San Ginés, Arrecife, church in Arrecife, Lanzarote
San Ginés, Guadalajara, church in Guadalajara, Spain